As a major port, the Philadelphia city government has operated multiple fireboats.

References

Philadelphia
Transportation in Philadelphia